Thomas Joseph McQuaid (1 February 1936 – 1981) was an Irish professional footballer who played as a wing half.

Career
Born in Dublin, McQuaid played for Thackley, Bradford City and Worksop Town.

References

1936 births
1981 deaths
Association footballers from Dublin (city)
Republic of Ireland association footballers
Association football wing halves
Thackley F.C. players
Bradford City A.F.C. players
Worksop Town F.C. players
English Football League players